Richard Maurice Bucke (18 March 1837 – 19 February 1902), often called Maurice Bucke, was a prominent  Canadian psychiatrist in the late 19th century.

An adventurer during his youth, Bucke later studied medicine. Eventually, as a psychiatrist, he headed the provincial Asylum for the Insane in London, Ontario.  Bucke was a friend of several noted men of letters in Canada, the United States, and England.

Besides publishing professional articles, Bucke wrote three non-fiction books: Man's Moral Nature, Walt Whitman, and Cosmic Consciousness: A Study in the Evolution of the Human Mind, which is his best-known work.

Early life
Richard Maurice Bucke was born in 1837 in Methwold, England, the son of Rev. Horatio Walpole Bucke (a parish curate) and his wife Clarissa Andrews. The parents and their children emigrated to Canada when he was a year old, settling near London, Ontario.

Horatio W. Bucke had given up the profession of religious minister, and trusted his family's income to their Ontario farm. A sibling in a large family, Richard Maurice Bucke was a typical farm boy of that era. He was an athletic boy who enjoyed a good ball game. When he left home at the age of 16, he traveled to Columbus, Ohio and then to California. Along the way, Bucke worked at various odd jobs. He was part of a travelling party who had to fight for their lives when they were attacked by Shoshone Indians, on whose territory they were trespassing.

In the winter of 1857–58, he was nearly frozen to death in the mountains of California, where he was the sole survivor of a silver-mining party. He had to walk out over the mountains and suffered extreme frostbite. As a result, a foot and several of his toes were amputated. He then returned to Canada via the Isthmus of Panama, probably in 1858.

Medicine and Psychiatry

Bucke enrolled in McGill University's medical school in Montreal, where he delivered a distinguished thesis in 1862. Although he practiced general medicine briefly as a ship's surgeon (in order to pay for his sea travel), he later specialized in psychiatry. He did his internship in London (1862–63) at University College Hospital. During that time he visited France.

He was for several years an enthusiast for Auguste Comte's positivist philosophy. Huston Smith said of Comte's philosophy: "Auguste Comte had laid down the line: religion belonged to the childhood of the human race....  All genuine knowledge is contained within the boundaries of science."  Comte's belief that religion, if by that is meant spirituality, had been outmoded by science contrasts with Bucke's later belief concerning the nature of reality.

Bucke returned to Canada in 1864 and married Jessie Gurd in 1865; they had eight children. 
In January 1876, Bucke became the superintendent of the Asylum for the Insane in Hamilton, Ontario. In 1877, he was appointed head of the provincial Asylum for the Insane in London, Ontario, a post he held for nearly the remainder of his life. In his work with asylum inmates, he was a reformer who encouraged organized sports and what is now called occupational therapy. Some of his surgical treatments proved deeply controversial. After adopting the Victorian-era theory that mental illness in women was often due to defective reproductive organs, Bucke began performing surgical removals of these organs from female patients. He continued this practice until his death, despite receiving increasing amounts of criticism from the medical health care community.

Cosmic consciousness experience

In 1872, after an evening of stimulating conversation with his friend Walt Whitman in the countryside, Richard M Bucke was traveling back to London in a buggy.  He relates: 

I was in a state of quiet, almost passive enjoyment. All at once, without warning of any kind, I found myself wrapped around as it were by a flame-coloured cloud. For an instant I thought of fire, some sudden conflagration in the great city; the next, I knew that the light was within me.

Directly afterward came upon me a sense of exultation, of immense joyousness accompanied by an intellectual illumination quite impossible to describe. Into my brain streamed one momentary lightning—flash of the Divine Splendor which has ever since lightened my life; upon my heart fell one drop of Divine Bliss, leaving thenceforward for always an aftertaste of heaven.

Among other things, I did not come to believe: I saw and knew that the Cosmos is not dead matter but a living Presence, that the soul of man is immortal, that the universe is so built and ordered that without any peradventure all things work together for the good of each and all, that the foundation principle of the world is what we call love, and that the happiness of everyone in the long run is absolutely certain.

I learned more within the few seconds that illumination lasted than in all my previous years of study and I learned much that no study could ever have taught.

                Paraphrased in the first person from the book "Cosmic Consciousness" by Richard M Bucke.  

He later described the characteristics and effects of the faculty of experiencing this type of consciousness as:
 its sudden appearance
 a subjective experience of light ("inner light")
 moral elevation
 intellectual illumination
 a sense of immortality
 loss of a fear of death
 loss of a sense of sin

Bucke's personal experience of the inner state had yet another attribute, mentioned separately by the author: the vivid sense of the universe as a living presence, rather than as basically lifeless, inert matter.

Bucke did not immediately record the details and interpretation of his experience. This was not done until years later, and only after he had researched much of the world's literature on mysticism and enlightenment and had corresponded with many others about this subject.

Cosmic Consciousness

Bucke's magnum opus was his book Cosmic Consciousness: A Study in the Evolution of the Human Mind. The book is a compilation of various theories rather than strictly a simple record of his original mystical experience.

Bucke borrowed the term "cosmic consciousness" from Edward Carpenter, who had traveled and studied religion in the East. Bucke's friend, Carpenter, had derived the term "cosmic consciousness" from the Eastern term "universal consciousness." In his description of his personal experience, Bucke combined his recollection with thoughts of another of his friends, Caleb Pink ("C.P.")—and others—and recorded his experience in a poetic style.

Cosmic Consciousness was a book which he researched and wrote over a period of many years. It was published in 1901 and has been reprinted several times since then. In it, Bucke describes his own experience, the experiences of contemporaries (most notably Walt Whitman), and the experiences of historical figures, including Jesus, Saint Paul, Muhammad, Plotinus, Dante, Francis Bacon,  William Blake, Buddha, and Ramakrishna.

Bucke developed a theory that posited three stages in the development of consciousness:

 the simple consciousness of animals
 the self-consciousness of the mass of humanity (encompassing reason, imagination, and foresight)
 cosmic consciousness — an emerging faculty which is the next stage of human development

Within self-consciousness, there exist gradations among individuals in their degrees of intellectual development and talent. (Bucke considered that no doubt there would be gradations within the level of cosmic consciousness, as well.)

Among the effects of humanity's natural evolutionary progression, Bucke believed he detected a long historical trend in which religious conceptions and theologies had become less and less frightening.

In Cosmic Consciousness, beginning with Part II, Bucke explains how animals developed the senses of hearing and seeing. Further development culminated in the ability to experience and enjoy music. Bucke states that, initially, only a small number of humans were able to see colors and experience music. But eventually these new abilities spread throughout the human race until only a very small number of people were unable to experience colors and music.

In Part III, Bucke hypothesizes that the next stage of human development, which he calls "cosmic consciousness," is slowly beginning to appear and will eventually spread throughout all of humanity.

Bucke’s vision of the world was profoundly optimistic. He wrote in Part I (“First Words”) “that the universe is so built and ordered that without any peradventure all things work together for the good of each and all, that the foundation principle of the world is what we call love and that the happiness of every one is in the long run absolutely certain.”

Involvement with poetry and literature

Bucke was deeply involved in the poetry scene in America and had friends among the literati, especially those who were poets. In 1869, he read Leaves of Grass by Walt Whitman, an American poet, and was deeply impressed by it.  In Cosmic Consciousness, he notes that his cosmic consciousness experience occurred following a night reading Whitman and Romantic poets. Later, he met Whitman in 1877 in Camden, New Jersey, and the two developed a lasting friendship.

Bucke later testified that he was "lifted to and set upon a higher plane of existence" because of his friendship with Whitman. He published a biography of Whitman in 1883 and was one of Whitman's literary executors.

In 1882, Bucke was elected to the English Literature Section of the Royal Society of Canada.

Death

On February 19, 1902, Bucke slipped on a patch of ice in front of his home and struck his head. He died a few hours later without regaining consciousness.

Legacy

Bucke's concept of cosmic consciousness took on a life of its own (though not always well understood) and influenced the thought and writings of many other people. His work is directly referenced by the mystics Franklin Merrell-Wolff and Ouspensky, and it was essential to Aldous Huxley's concept of the perennial philosophy and Evelyn Underhill's concept of mysticism. In India, Aurobindo uses the term cosmic consciousness extensively in his work  and Ramana Maharshi was asked about Bucke's concept. Erich Fromm says, in Psychoanalysis and Zen Buddhism, 'What Bucke describes as cosmic consciousness is, in my opinion, precisely the experience which is called satori in Zen Buddhism' and that "Bucke's book is perhaps the book most germane to the topic of this article."

Along with William James's classic work The Varieties of Religious Experience (which cites Bucke), Bucke's Cosmic Consciousness has become part of the foundation of transpersonal psychology.

Bucke was part of a movement that sought to improve the care and treatment of mentally ill persons.

He was one of the founders of the Medical School of the University of Western Ontario. His papers are held at Western University's Archives and Research Collections Centre.  The finding aid can be found here  https://www.lib.uwo.ca/files/archives/archives_finding_aids/Dr._R.M._Bucke_Finding_Aid1.pdf

He was portrayed by Colm Feore in the 1990 Canadian film Beautiful Dreamers.

Publications
 
 Cosmic Consciousness: A Study in the Evolution of the Human Mind,1905 Innes edition, facsimile, 37 MB PDF file.
 Diary of R. Maurice Bucke, M.D., C.M, 1863.
 Man's Moral Nature: An Essay, 1879 Internet Archive
 Richard Maurice Bucke, Medical Mystic: Letters of Dr. Bucke to Walt Whitman and His Friends, Artem Lozynsky (editor), 1977, Wayne State University Press, .
 The New Consciousness: Selected Papers of Richard Maurice Bucke 1997, compiled by Cyril Greenland & John Robert Colombo. Toronto: Colombo & Company.
 Walt Whitman (original 1883 edition). OCLC 859421735
 Walt Whitman's Canada 1992, compiled by Cyril Greenland & John Robert Colombo. Toronto: Hounslow Press.

See also
 Cosmic Consciousness
 New Thought
 Nondualism
 Recept
 Spirituality
 Walter Russell
 Henry Landor

References

Bibliography
.
James H Coyne, Richard Maurice Bucke: A Sketch, 1906, J. Hope & Sons 
George Hope Stevenson, The Life and Work of Richard Maurice Bucke,: An Appraisal, 1937 (American Journal of Psychiatry, 93, pp. 1127 – 1150)
Cyril Greenland, Richard Maurice Bucke, M.D. 1837-1902. The evolution of a mystic, 1966
Samuel Edward Dole Shortt, Victorian Lunacy : Richard M. Bucke and the Practice of Late Nineteenth-Century Psychiatry, 1986, Cambridge University Press, 
Peter Rechnitzer, The Life of Dr. R.M. Bucke, 1994, Quarry Press 1997 edition: 
P. D. Ouspensky, The Cosmic Consciousness of Dr. Richard M. Bucke, Kessinger Publishing,  2005 edition:  (48 pp)
Susan Maynard, The Illumination of Dr. Bucke: A Journey Beyond the Intellect, 2014, AuthorHouse, Kindle eBooks: ASIN: B00MJ5YKFA (website: http://theilluminationofdrbucke.com)

External links

Biography at the Dictionary of Canadian Biography Online
Notes on Bucke at McGill University
Collections at University of Western Ontario
Zero Summer
Cosmic Consciousness at Google Books

1837 births
1902 deaths
Canadian psychiatrists
Pre-Confederation Ontario people
19th-century mystics
University of Western Ontario
McGill University Faculty of Medicine alumni